Parablennius serratolineatus, also known as the Norfolk Island blenny, is a species of combtooth blenny found in the southwest Pacific ocean near Norfolk Island.

References

serratolineatus
Taxa named by Hans Bath
Taxa named by J. Barry Hutchins
Fish described in 1986
Fish of the Pacific Ocean
Fish of Oceania